Marcgraviastrum gigantophyllum is a species of plant in the Marcgraviaceae family. It is endemic to Ecuador. The vine's natural habitat is subtropical or tropical moist montane areas of the Andes Ecuadorian ranges.

References

gigantophyllum
Endemic flora of Ecuador
Flora of the Andes
Vulnerable plants
Taxonomy articles created by Polbot